The Montenegrin Olympic Committee (Montenegrin: Црногорски олимпијски комитет / Crnogorski olimpijski komitet) is the National Olympic Committee representing Montenegro. It is responsible for promoting the Olympic ideals and for ensuring that Montenegro is represented with athletes at the Olympic Games and other multi-sport events. The committee's president, is Dušan Simonović.

Members of the committee are 20 sports federations, which elect the Executive Council composed of the president and sixteen members.

The MOC organizes the 2019 Games of the Small States of Europe in Budva.

History

The Montenegrin Olympic Committee was founded in 2006 after  Montenegrin independence referendum and recognized by the IOC in 2007.

List of presidents

Executive committee
President: Dušan Sinomović
Vice presidents: Boro Mračević, Bojana Popović
Members: Dimitrije Rašović, Jovica Rečević, Dragan Samardžić, Božidar Vuksanović, Dejan Bajić, Veselin Barović, Momir Đurđevac, Branko Jovanović, Dragan Kopitović, Rajko Kosić, Džemal Ljušković, Vanja Mugoša, Cvetko Pajković, Radmila Petrović

Member federations

The Montenegrin National Federations are the organizations that coordinate all aspects of their individual sports. They are responsible for training, competition and development of their sports. There are currently 19 Olympic Summer and one Winter Sport Federations in Montenegro.

Awards

Since 1999, at the end of each calendar year proclaimed the most successful athletes. Initially declared Young Male Athlete, Young Female Athlete, Men's Team and Woman's Team, awards for the Sportsman of the Year were introduced in 2011. The competition includes results from current Olympic sports.

See also
Montenegro at the Olympics

External links
 

Montenegro
Montenegro at the Olympics
Olympic
2006 establishments in Montenegro
Sports organizations established in 2006